Saqr (Arabic: صقر 'falcon') or Sakr is an Arabic given name and surname.

Saqr and Sakr may also refer to:

Al-Saqr SC, a Yemeni sport and cultural club based in Taiz, Yemen
Al Saqr, a minesweeper of South Yemen, formerly 
Saqr (drone), a Saudi Arabian unmanned aerial vehicle
Camp Al-Saqr, a former United States military operating base in Iraq
Al Saqr Field Airport, a private airfield near Ras al-Khaimah, UAE
Sakr, an Egyptian tug, formerly Empire Warlock

See also

 Shakir, a name
 Sakhir, an area of Bahrain
 Şakir, a Turkish name
 Sakhr (disambiguation)